Nelson Burton may refer to:

Nelson Burton Sr. (1906–1994), American professional bowler
Nelson Burton Jr. (born 1942), American professional bowler and television commentator
Nelson Burton (ice hockey) (born 1957), Canadian professional hockey player who played for American and Canadian teams